Two cruisers of the German navy were named Niobe and built in 1898:

 , in service 1900–1925
 , in service 1940–1944

German Navy ship names